Baoding Yingli ETS is a professional Chinese football club that participates in the China League One division under licence from the Chinese Football Association (CFA). The team is based in Baoding, Hebei and their home stadium is the 13,000 capacity Baoding People's Stadium. Their owner is the Baoding City Real Estate Group Co., Ltd.

History
The club was originally formed as Hebei Yingli (河北英利) in 2008 as an affiliated team by the China Yingli group, where they took part as an amateur team in the Hebei Amateur Football League. With a team built using Yingli employees they were able to reach the China Amateur Football League finals where they came fourth in the 2010 championship. After this performance the Baoding City Real Estate Group Co., Ltd became interested in acquiring the club so they could register them in and gain participation in the China League Two division. This would come into fruition on April 21, 2015 when they officially took over the club, renamed them Baoding Yingli ETS F.C. and converted them into a professional team when they participated at the bottom of the professional Chinese football league within the 2015 China League Two season. In their debut season Fan Yuhong was brought in as the Head coach and the club would play within the Baoding Foreign Language School Stadium. After finishing fifth within their group stage and missing out on the play-offs Zhao Changhong was brought in as the new manager the following season, where with continued investment from Baoding City Real Estate Group along with a move to Baoding People's Stadium, he was able to guide the club to a runners-up spot at the end of the 2016 China League Two season and promotion to the China League One division for the first time. On 1 July 2017, Meng Yongli, chairman of the club, announced that the club would withdraw from the league after Baoding conceded a controversial penalty in the injury time against Wuhan Zall. Meng Yongli resigned on the following day, as the club proclaimed their stay in the league, and would be willing to accept punishment from the Chinese Football Association. Unfortunately, the team were still relegated at the end of their first season in the League One.

Name history
 2008–2015: Hebei Yingli F.C. (河北英利)
 2015–present: Baoding Yingli ETS F.C. (保定英利易通)

Coaching staff

Managerial history

  Fan Yuhong (2015)
  Zhao Changhong (2016–25 May 2017)
  Jo Bonfrère (25 May 2017–9 Oct 2017)
  Shang Qing (caretaker) (9 Oct 2017–16 Dec 2017)
  Han Yalin (10 Feb 2018–25 Jan 2019)
  Fan Yuhong (25 Jan 2019–31 Dec 2019)

Results
All-time league rankings

As of the end of 2019 season.

 in North Group.
 Baoding Yingli ETS was deducted six points for failing to implement ruling of CFA.

Key
 Pld = Played
 W = Games won
 D = Games drawn
 L = Games lost
 F = Goals for
 A = Goals against
 Pts = Points
 Pos = Final position

 DNQ = Did not qualify
 DNE = Did not enter
 NH = Not Held
 – = Does Not Exist
 R1 = Round 1
 R2 = Round 2
 R3 = Round 3
 R4 = Round 4

 F = Final
 SF = Semi-finals
 QF = Quarter-finals
 R16 = Round of 16
 Group = Group stage
 GS2 = Second Group stage
 QR1 = First Qualifying Round
 QR2 = Second Qualifying Round
 QR3 = Third Qualifying Round

References

Football clubs in China
Defunct football clubs in China